The 2005 Wizard Home Loans Cup was the name of the AFL pre-season competition for 2005. The attendance for all matches was 317,761, with an average attendance of 21,184 per game. The Michael Tuck medal (awarded to the best & fairest in the pre-season final) was awarded to Brendan Fevola of the Carlton Football Club. Carlton defeated the West Coast Eagles in the final 1.14.18 (111) to 1.11.9 (84). Carlton went on to receive the wooden spoon in the regular home-and-away season.

Games

Round 1

|- bgcolor="#CCCCFF"
| Home team
| Home team score
| Away team
| Away team score
| Ground
| Crowd
| Date
|- bgcolor="#FFFFFF"
| Collingwood
| 3.12.16 (115)
| Richmond
| 5.9.9 (108)
| Telstra Dome
| 33,639
| Friday, 18 February
|- bgcolor="#FFFFFF"
| Fremantle
| 0.11.7 (73)
| West Coast| 0.12.8 (80)| Subiaco Oval
| 38,124
| Friday, 18 February
|- bgcolor="#FFFFFF"
| Western Bulldogs| 1.11.15 (90)| Sydney
| 0.11.4 (70)
| Telstra Dome
| 10,580
| Saturday, 19 February
|- bgcolor="#FFFFFF"
| Hawthorn
| 1.8.9 (66)
| St Kilda| 1.8.18 (75)| Telstra Dome
| 27,513
| Saturday, 19 February
|- bgcolor="#FFFFFF"
| Brisbane Lions
| 0.7.11 (53)
| Melbourne| 3.10.11 (98)
| Cazaly's Stadium
| 9,486
| Saturday, 19 February
|- bgcolor="#FFFFFF"
| Kangaroos| 0.7.12 (54)| Geelong
| 0.4.5 (29)
| Manuka Oval
| 3,540
| Sunday, 20 February
|- bgcolor="#FFFFFF"
| Carlton| 2.13.11 (107)| Essendon
| 2.7.10 (70)
| Telstra Dome
| 23,220
| Sunday, 20 February
|- bgcolor="#FFFFFF"
| Adelaide
| 1.7.9 (60)
| Port Adelaide
| 0.11.9 (75)
| AAMI Stadium
| 26,161
| Sunday, 20 February

Quarter-finals

|- bgcolor="#CCCCFF"
| Home team
| Home team score
| Away team
| Away team score
| Ground
| Crowd
| Date
|- bgcolor="#FFFFFF"
| St Kilda
| 1.9.11 (74)
| Western Bulldogs
| 2.10.7 (85)
| Aurora Stadium
| 12,948
| Friday, 25 February
|- bgcolor="#FFFFFF"
| Kangaroos
| 1.15.21 (120)
| Port Adelaide
| 2.9.4 (76)
| Telstra Dome
| 10,032
| Saturday, 26 February
|- bgcolor="#FFFFFF"
| West Coast
| 1.14.13 (106)
| Collingwood
| 1.7.4 (55)
| Marrara Oval
| 10,780
| Saturday, 26 February
|- bgcolor="#FFFFFF"
| Melbourne
| 1.12.16 (97)
| Carlton
| 1.15.8 (107)
| Telstra Dome
| 17,249
| Sunday, 27 February

Semi-finals

|- bgcolor="#CCCCFF"
| Home team
| Home team score
| Away team
| Away team score
| Ground
| Crowd
| Date
|- bgcolor="#FFFFFF"
| West Coast
| 2.15.12 (120)
| Kangaroos
| 0.5.10 (40)
| Subiaco Oval
| 25,059
| Friday, 4 March
|- bgcolor="#FFFFFF"
| Western Bulldogs
| 1.11.7 (82)
| Carlton
| 0.21.7 (133)
| Telstra Dome
| 26,039
| Saturday, 5 March

Grand Final

|- bgcolor="#CCCCFF"
| Home team
| Home team score
| Away team
| Away team score
| Ground
| Crowd
| Date
|- bgcolor="#FFFFFF"
| Carlton
| 1.14.18 (111)
| West Coast
| 1.11.9 (84)
| Telstra Dome
| 43,391
| Saturday, 12 March

Goal tally

This table shows how many goals the two grand finalists have scored throughout the entire pre-season competition. The host of the grand final is determined on how many goals a winning semi finalists kicks over the three weeks they've been in the competition for.

See also 
Australian Football League pre-season competition
2005 AFL season

References 

Wizard Home Loans Cup
Australian Football League pre-season competition